Aglaea or Aglaïa is one of the three Charites or Gratiae (Graces) in Greek mythology.

Family 

According to Hesiod, Aglaea is the youngest of the Charites, the three daughters of Zeus and the Oceanid Eurynome. The mythographer Apollodorus, in contrast, calls them the children of Zeus by Eunomia, the goddess of good order and lawful conduct.

Aglaea's two sisters are Euphrosyne, the goddess of joy or mirth, and Thalia, the goddess of festivity and rich banquets. Together they are known as the Charites in Greek mythology or the Gratiae (Graces) in Roman mythology, and they were responsible for overseeing all feasts and dances. They were part of the retinue of Aphrodite with Aglaea sometimes acting as her messenger.

Aglaea was married to Hephaestus, typically seen as after his divorce from Aphrodite, and by him she became mother of Eucleia ("Good Repute"), Eupheme ("Acclaim"), Euthenia ("Prosperity"), and Philophrosyne ("Welcome").

Mythology 

Aglaea was also known as Charis (the Grace) and Kale (Beauty).

Notes

References 
 Apollodorus, The Library with an English Translation by Sir James George Frazer, F.B.A., F.R.S. in 2 Volumes, Cambridge, MA, Harvard University Press; London, William Heinemann Ltd. 1921. ISBN 0-674-99135-4. Online version at the Perseus Digital Library. Greek text available from the same website.
 Bell, Robert E., Women of Classical Mythology: A Biographical Dictionary, ABC-Clio, 1991. . Internet Archive.
 Brill’s New Pauly: Encyclopaedia of the Ancient World. Antiquity, Volume 1, A-Ari, editors: Hubert Cancik, Helmuth Schneider, Brill, 2002. . Online version at Brill.
 Grimal, Pierre, The Dictionary of Classical Mythology, Wiley-Blackwell, 1996. . Internet Archive.
 Hard, Robin, The Routledge Handbook of Greek Mythology: Based on H.J. Rose's "Handbook of Greek Mythology", Psychology Press, 2004. . Google Books.
 Hesiod, Theogony from The Homeric Hymns and Homerica with an English Translation by Hugh G. Evelyn-White, Cambridge, MA.,Harvard University Press; London, William Heinemann Ltd. 1914. Online version at the Perseus Digital Library.
 Kern, Otto, Orphicorum Fragmenta, Berlin, 1922. Internet Archive.
Nonnus of Panopolis, Dionysiaca translated by William Henry Denham Rouse (1863-1950), from the Loeb Classical Library, Cambridge, MA, Harvard University Press, 1940.  Online version at the Topos Text Project.
Pindar, Odes translated by Diane Arnson Svarlien. 1990. Online version at the Perseus Digital Library.
Pindar, The Odes of Pindar including the Principal Fragments with an Introduction and an English Translation by Sir John Sandys, Litt.D., FBA. Cambridge, MA., Harvard University Press; London, William Heinemann Ltd. 1937. Greek text available at the Perseus Digital Library.
 Smith, William; Dictionary of Greek and Roman Biography and Mythology, London (1873). "Charis".

Greek goddesses
Beauty goddesses
Children of Zeus
Consorts of Hephaestus